American Spy is a novel by Lauren Wilkinson, published in February 2019 by Random House. Barack Obama included the book on his 2019 summer reading list. The novel details the struggle and growth of Marie, an African American woman, as she recounts her time in the FBI.

References

2019 American novels
2019 debut novels
Random House books